Ayanna MacCalla Howard (born January 24, 1972) is an American roboticist, entrepreneur and educator currently serving as the dean of the College of Engineering at Ohio State University. Assuming the post in March 2021, Howard became the first woman to lead the Ohio State College of Engineering.

Howard previously served as the chair of the School of Interactive Computing in the Georgia Tech College of Computing, the Linda J. and Mark C. Smith Endowed Chair in Bioengineering in the School of Electrical and Computer Engineering, and the director of the Human-Automation Systems (HumAnS) Lab.

Early life and education
As a little girl Howard was interested in aliens and robots and her favorite TV show was The Bionic Woman. Howard received her B.S. in engineering from Brown University in 1993 and her M.S. and Ph.D. in electrical engineering from the University of Southern California in 1994 and 1999, respectively. Her thesis Recursive Learning for Deformable Object Manipulation was advised by George A. Bekey. Howard also has an MBA from Claremont Graduate University.

Career
Howard's early interest in artificial intelligence led her to a senior position at Seattle-based Axcelis Inc, where she helped develop Evolver, the first commercial genetic algorithm, and Brainsheet, a neural network developed in partnership with Microsoft. From 1993 to 2005, she worked at the NASA Jet Propulsion Laboratory  where she held multiple roles including senior robotics researcher and deputy manager in the Office of the Chief Scientist.

She joined Georgia Tech in 2005 as an associate professor and the founder of the HumAnS lab. She has also served as the associate director of research for Georgia Tech's Institute for Robotics and Intelligent Machines and as chair of the multidisciplinary robotics Ph.D. program at Georgia Tech. In 2017 she became the chair of the School of Interactive Computing at Georgia Tech.

In 2008, she received worldwide attention for her SnoMote robots, designed to study the impact of global warming on the Antarctic ice shelves. In 2013, she founded Zyrobotics, which has released their first suite of therapy and educational products for children with special needs.

Howard has authored 250 publications in refereed journals and conferences, including serving as co-editor/co-author of more than a dozen books and/or book chapters. She has also been awarded four patents and has given over 140 invited talks and/or keynotes. She is a fellow of the Association for the Advancement of Artificial Intelligence (AAAI) and the Institute of Electrical and Electronics Engineers (IEEE). Among her many honors, Howard received the Computer Research Association's A. Nico Habermann Award and the Richard A. Tapia Achievement Award.

In a 2020 interview on Marketplace, Howard outlined the ways in which companion robots would fill the gap left by social distancing as a result of the COVID-19 pandemic in the United States.

On November 30, 2020, the Columbus Dispatch reported Howard has been named the next dean of the College of Engineering at Ohio State University, to begin March 1, pending approval by the board of trustees. On March 1, 2021, Howard assumed the role becoming the first woman to hold the position.

In 2021, Ayanna Howard received the Athena Lecturer Award from Association for Computing Machinery (ACM) for her Contributions to Robotics, AI and Broadening Participation in Computing. In June 2022, Howard was elected a trustee of Brown University.

Research
Howard's research interests include human-robot interaction, assistive/rehabilitation robotics, science-driven/field robotics, and perception, learning, and reasoning.

Howard's research and published works span across various topics in robotics and AI, including intelligent learning, virtual reality for rehabilitation and robotics in the role of pediatric therapy. Her research is highlighted by her focus on technology development for intelligent agents that must interact with and in a human-centered world. This work, which addresses issues of human-robot interaction, learning, and autonomous control, has resulted in more than 200 peer-reviewed publications.

Honors and awards
Howard's numerous accomplishments have been documented in more than a dozen featured articles. In 2003, she was named to the MIT Technology Review TR100 as one of the top 100 innovators in the world under the age of 35. She was featured in Time magazine's "Rise of the Machines" article in 2004. She was also featured in the USA Today Science & Space article. 

Some of Howard's awards include:

 Lew Allen Award for Excellence (formerly the Director's Research Achievement Award of the Jet Propulsion Laboratory) for significant technical contributions, 2001 
 MIT Technology Review Top 100 Young Innovators of the Year, 2003
 NAE Gilbreth Lectureship, 2010
 A. Richard Newton Educator ABIE Award, Anita Borg Institute, 2014
 Computer Research Association's A. Nico Habermann Award, 2016
 Brown Engineering Alumni Medal (BEAM), 2016
 AAAS-Lemelson Invention Ambassador, 2016-2017
 Atlanta magazine's Women Making a Mark, 2017
 Walker's Legacy #WLPower25 Atlanta Award, 2017
 Forbes America's Top 50 Women In Tech, 2018
ACM Athena Lecturer Award, 2021
2021 class of Fellows of the American Association for the Advancement of Science.
 2023 AAAI/EAAI Patrick Henry Winston Outstanding Educator Award

References

External links
 Home Page
 ECE Profile
 Presenter at Cusp Conference 2008
 United Nations Academic Impact Podcast Interview

1972 births
Artificial intelligence researchers
Georgia Tech faculty
Living people
Machine learning researchers
American roboticists
Women roboticists
American women computer scientists
African-American computer scientists
American computer scientists
Brown University School of Engineering alumni
USC Viterbi School of Engineering alumni
African-American women engineers
American women engineers
African-American engineers
American women academics
21st-century African-American people
21st-century African-American women
20th-century African-American people
20th-century African-American women
Fellows of the American Association for the Advancement of Science